Matthew D. Elam (born September 21, 1991) is an American football safety for the Orlando Guardians of the XFL. He played college football at Florida, where he earned All-American honors. He was drafted by the Baltimore Ravens in the first round of the 2013 NFL Draft.

Early years
Elam was born in Palm Beach Gardens, Florida.  He attended William T. Dwyer High School in Palm Beach Gardens, where he played linebacker, defensive back, running back and wide receiver for the Dwyer Panthers high school football team.  As a senior, he had 1,883 rushing yards and 27 touchdowns.  He was named Gatorade High School Football Player of the Year and Mr. Football for the state of Florida, and a USA Today high school All-American.  He played in the 2010 U.S. Army All-American Bowl, where he announced his intent to play at the University of Florida during the game.  He is the younger brother of former NFL safety Abram Elam and the uncle of current NFL cornerback Kaiir Elam.

College career
Elam accepted an athletic scholarship to attend the University of Florida, where he played for coach Urban Meyer and coach Will Muschamp's Florida Gators football teams from 2010 to 2012.  As a freshman in 2010, Elam played in all 13 games and recorded 22 tackles.  As a full-time starter during his 2011 sophomore season, he had 78 tackles, two interceptions and two quarterback sacks.  Following his junior season in 2012, he was named a first-team All-American by the Associated Press, The Sporting News, CBS Sports, Scout.com and Sports Illustrated, as well as a second-team selection by the Walter Camp Football Foundation.  He was also a first-team All-Southeastern Conference selection and a semifinalist for both the Thorpe Award and Bednarik Award.

College statistics

Professional career

Elam was viewed as one of the top safeties in 2013 years draft class.  Some experts and scouts said he lacked size for a safety with just a height of 5' 10" and maybe should be moved to corner because of that.  He is known for his ability to make electrifying plays all over the field and for his emotional leadership.  Most experts projected Elam to go  mid- or in the late first round of the NFL Draft.

Baltimore Ravens

The Baltimore Ravens selected him in the first round (32nd overall pick) of the 2013 NFL Draft.  After a promising rookie season, Elam struggled the following year causing him to lose playing time.  On August 31, 2015, Elam was placed on injured reserve, after suffering a torn bicep and missed the entire 2015 NFL season.

On May 2, 2016, the Ravens did not pick up the optional fifth year of his contract. On September 5, 2016, Elam was placed on injured reserve. Elam was activated off injured reserve on November 5, 2016 prior to Week 9.

With declining performance since his rookie year, missing significant playing time, and given the Ravens decision to not pick up the final year of his rookie contract, Elam was considered a bust given his status as a first-round draft pick.

After his arrest on February 26, 2017, the  Ravens released a statement regarding the upcoming free agent, stating "we are aware of the arrest of Matt Elam. Matt is not in our plans for the 2017 Ravens", indicating their plans of moving on from Elam.

Saskatchewan Roughriders
Elam signed to the Saskatchewan Roughriders' practice roster on July 2, 2018. He was promoted to the active roster on July 24, but was placed on the suspended list on November 7. He was released on May 24, 2019.

DC Defenders
In October 2019, Elam was picked by the DC Defenders during the open phase of the 2020 XFL Draft. He was waived on March 3, 2020.

Tucson Sugar Skulls

On March 13, 2021 Elam signed with the Tucson Sugar Skulls of the IFL (Indoor Football League).

Edmonton Elks
The Elks announced the signing of Elam on January 26, 2022. He was released on June 27, 2022.

Orlando Guardians
Elam was selected in the 11th round of the 2023 XFL Defensive Backs Draft, by the Orlando Guardians.

NFL career statistics
Note: Statistics are correct through Week 17 of the 2016 NFL season.

Legal troubles
On February 26, 2017, Elam was arrested in Miami, Florida for possession of 126.2 grams of marijuana and 3.1 grams of oxycodone. He was charged with one count of cannabis possession, one count of possession of cannabis with intent to sell or deliver, and one count of possession of a controlled substance. On June 26, 2017, the drug charges were dropped.

On May 22, 2017, Elam was arrested on battery and theft charges involving a dispute with his girlfriend over an iPhone. Delray Beach Police charged him with suspicion of grand theft and misdemeanor battery after confrontation and was booked in Palm Beach County Jail and had a bond set at $4,500. According to a police report, he went to his girlfriend's residence to pick up a vehicle and attempted to grab her iPhone from her hand after she refused to give him his money. During the process of grabbing the phone, the couple fell to the ground and continued to struggle over it. She then entered his vehicle and took his cell phone and Elam responded by leaving after she refused to return it. On June 21, 2017, the charges were dropped after the prosecutor said the accuser would not cooperate and they had insufficient evidence to proceed with the case.

See also

 2012 College Football All-America Team
 List of Baltimore Ravens first-round draft picks
 List of Florida Gators football All-Americans
 List of Florida Gators in the NFL Draft

References

External links
  Matt Elam – Baltimore Ravens player profile
  Matt Elam – Florida Gators athlete profile

1991 births
Living people
American football safeties
Florida Gators football players
Baltimore Ravens players
People from Palm Beach Gardens, Florida
Players of American football from Florida
Saskatchewan Roughriders players
Sportspeople from the Miami metropolitan area
Canadian football defensive backs
DC Defenders players
Edmonton Elks players
Orlando Guardians players
Ed Block Courage Award recipients